Albert Dufour-Feronce (1868–1945) was a German diplomat who served in the League of Nations as one of its permanent undersecretaries.

External links
 Roster of the League of Nations

1868 births
1945 deaths
League of Nations people
German diplomats